Coenonympha glycerion, the chestnut heath, is a butterfly species belonging to the family Nymphalidae. It can be found in Eastern Europe and east across the Palearctic to Siberia and the Caucasus to North Korea.

Description in Seitz
C. iphis H. l. (= amyntas Btlr., mandane Ky.) (48 c). Disc of the forewing of the male on the upperside washed with copper-brown, of the female with yellowish brown, this colour being sometimes of a darker (ab. subnigra), sometimes of a lighter shade (ab. pallida). Hindwing uniformly blackish brown. Underside of forewing entirely without ocelli, rarely with a small, pale, apical ocellus. Hindwing with a few scattered and reduced ocelli on the underside. Beyond the middle are 2 large irregular white sinuous patches, either separate or thinly connected, by which the nymotypical form is recognized at a glance. The whole of Central and a large part of Northern Europe, and North and Central Asia; from England and Belgium to the Pacific Ocean, and from Finland and Livonia anaxagoras. to Dalmatia. In ab. anaxagoras Assmus, which occurs singly in Central Europe and is prevalent in Eastern Europe, the metallic line on the underside is absent, and the ocelli on the hindwing are reduced. — In iphicles Stgr. (= heroides Christ.) (48 c), on the other hand, the ocelli of the hindwing are very regular and distinct and
appear on the upperside in the shape of brownish rings, so that there is a resemblance to hero ; from Central Asia. carpathica Horm. is a smaller mountain form the ocelli of whose hindwing are entirely or almost entirely obsolete; from the Carpathian Mts. — mahometana Alph. (84 a) also has no ocelli, or at the most a few white dots in their place; moreover, the upperside is uniformly soot-brown, and the whole underside dusted over with white; from the Tian-shan. ab. iphina Stgr. is a Central-Asiatic form in which the ocelli on the underside are bordered with brown ; it most probably does not occur anywhere as the only form of the species. — Larva dull green with a blue-green head, dark dorsal stripe and pale lateral one, as well as a red anal fork; spiracles yellowish red. Until May on grasses. Pupa green with white-spotted abdomen and dark-edged wing-cases. The butterflies are on the wing in June and July; they are found on grassy roads in woods and in damp meadows and are not rare, although there are not often large numbers of them together. The very big-bodied females do not often rise more than 1 or 2 feet above the ground. When disturbed they usually fly on only a few paces, following the direction of the road and settling again in the grass.

Flight period
The butterflies fly in one generation from June to August.

Food plants
The larvae feed on various grasses.

References

Sources
Species info
BioLib
"Coenonympha Hübner, [1819]" at Markku Savela's Lepidoptera and Some Other Life Forms

Coenonympha
Butterflies of Europe
Butterflies of Asia
Butterflies described in 1788
Taxa named by Moritz Balthasar Borkhausen